The Institution of Engineers and Shipbuilders in Scotland (IESIS) is a multi-disciplinary professional body and learned society, founded in Scotland, for professional engineers in all disciplines and for those associated with or taking an interest in their work. Its main activities are an annual series of evening talks on engineering, open to all, and a range of school events aimed at encouraging young people to consider engineering careers.

IESIS is registered as a Scottish Charity, No SC011583 and is the fourth oldest, still-active, registered Company in Scotland.

Members, Fellows, Graduates or Companions are entitled to use the abbreviated distinctive letters after their name - MIES, FIES, GIES, CIES.

Foundation
The inaugural meeting of the Institution of Engineers in Scotland was held on 1 May 1857. Office bearers were appointed and the principal objective of the new institution was set down as "the encouragement and advancement of Engineering Science and Practice". It was to have a broad basis for membership, and engineers from the mining, foundry, railway, iron, shipbuilding and other industries were to be eligible. The prime movers behind the founding of the Institution were William John Macquorn Rankine, Regius Professor of Civil Engineering and Mechanics at the University of Glasgow, and Walter Montgomerie Neilson, one of the major figures in establishing Glasgow's locomotive-building industry. Rankine was the first President of the Institution and Neilson succeeded him in 1859. The Engineer James Howden, who died in 1913, was the last surviving founding member of the Institution.

The Institution was an early promoter of consciousness of industrial effects on the environment. In those early years there was a pervading atmosphere of enquiry into the applications of steam power. In 1858 the Institution was responsible for a public meeting, held in the Glasgow City Chambers, to establish "An Association for Promoting Safety, Economy and Absence of Smoke in the raising and use of Steam".

The Scottish Shipbuilders Association had been formed in 1860 and amalgamated with the Institution of Engineers in Scotland on 25 October 1865. The name Institution of Engineers and Shipbuilders in Scotland was adopted in 1870. The first female President of the Institution, Karen Dinardo, took office on 4 October 2016, at the start of a two-year term. Her father, Carlo Dinardo, had been president in 1999–2001.

The Institution has had a number of headquarters. The building at 39 Elmbank Crescent, Glasgow was commissioned and built in 1906–08 and was designed by J.B. Wilson. In the foyer of this building, there is a memorial to the 36 engineers who died on RMS Titanic. The marble and bronze memorial was subscribed by members, designed by the sculptor William Kellock Brown, and unveiled on 15 April 1914. The Institution, with the permission of Scottish Opera, current occupiers of the building, organised a memorial service in the building on 14 April 2012.

Current name
In 2020, the Institution reverted its name to the Institution of Engineers in Scotland, reflecting the breadth of engineering disciplines among its membership and practised throughout Scotland.

Lectures
In addition to an annual programme of evening talks on various engineering topics, the Institution endows two prestige lectures:

 The annual MacMillan Memorial Lecture established in 1959 in memory of Hugh Miller MacMillan, a prominent shipbuilding Engineer in Scotland, England and Northern Ireland.
 The biennial Marlow (Scotland) Lecture established in 1964.

Both have attracted high-profile speakers.

Digitisation programme
IESIS has a significant collection of engineering papers and other materials in its archives. Since 2013, there has been a programme to digitise all Transactions of the Institution from its earliest days so that these may be made available as a reference resource.

Scottish Engineering Hall of Fame
In 2011, IESIS launched a new initiative, The Scottish Engineering Hall of Fame, to celebrate Scotland's tradition of engineering and shipbuilding. It provides role models for young people considering careers in engineering.

The first seven inductees were announced by President Gordon Masterton at the Institution's annual James Watt Dinner in September 2011. As of 2019, there have been 39 names added to the Hall of Fame, nine of whom were living inductees: Douglas Anderson (retinal imaging), Hugh Gill (bionic hand), Thomas Graham Brown (ultrasound scanner), Sir Donald Miller (electric power supply system), James Goodfellow (automated teller machine), Sir Duncan Michael (structural engineer and business leader), Craig Clark (satellite engineer), Naeem Hussain (bridge engineer) and Gordon McConnell (aircraft engineer). To date there have been four female inductees, Dorothée Pullinger, Anne Gillespie Shaw, Victoria Drummond and Mary Fergusson. 

The Hall of Fame panel encourages nominations from the public as well as members.

Presidents 
The following is a list of the presidents of the Institution since its inception:.

Notes

References

External links
Official website
MacMillan Memorial Lecture 
Marlow (Scotland) Lecture

 
Engineering societies based in the United Kingdom
Professional associations based in Scotland
Science and technology in Scotland
Shipbuilding in Scotland
1857 establishments in Scotland
Organizations established in 1857
Organisations based in Glasgow
Marine engineering organizations